Nowy Gościniec is a village in the administrative district of Gmina Zbąszynek, within Świebodzin County, Lubusz Voivodeship, in western Poland.

The village has a population of 60.

References

Villages in Świebodzin County